Leonardo Boff (born 14 December 1938), born as Genézio Darci Boff, is a Brazilian theologian, philosopher writer, and former Catholic priest known for his active support for Latin American liberation theology. He currently serves as Professor Emeritus of Ethics, Philosophy of Religion, and Ecology at the Rio de Janeiro State University. In 2001, he received the Right Livelihood Award for "his inspiring insights and practical work to help people realise the links between human spirituality, social justice and environmental stewardship."

Studies as a priest 
Boff was born in 1938 in Concórdia, Santa Catarina, Brazil. He entered the Franciscan Order in 1959 and was ordained a Catholic priest in 1964. He spent the following years studying for a doctorate in theology and philosophy at the University of Munich, which he received in 1970. Boff's doctoral thesis studied in what measure the Church can be a sign of the sacred and the divine in the secular world and in the process of liberation of the oppressed. He has since published his thesis as a book available in German, entitled Die Kirche als Sakrament im Horizont der Welterfahrung.

His brother is the theologian Clodovis Boff.

Liberation theology 
Boff became one of the best-known supporters (along with Gustavo Gutiérrez, Juan Luis Segundo and Jon Sobrino) of the early liberation theologians. He was present in the first reflections that sought to articulate indignation against poverty and marginalisation with a promissory discourse on faith, leading to Latin American liberation theology. He continues to be a controversial figure in the Catholic Church, primarily for his sharp criticism of the church's hierarchy, which he sees as "fundamentalist", but also for his political positions.

Political views 
Boff is critical of secular power, as well of American foreign policy. He opposed the Iraq War and considered George W. Bush and Ariel Sharon's leadership to be similar to that of "fundamentalist terrorist states". He also criticizes despotic rulers in the Middle East, saying: "Those [emirs and kings] are despotic, they do not even have a constitution. Though extremely rich, they maintain the people in poverty."

Boff has voiced his supported for the Campaign for the Establishment of a United Nations Parliamentary Assembly, an organisation which advocates for democratic reform in the United Nations, and the creation of a more accountable international political system.

Laicization 
Authorities in the Catholic Church did not consider Boff's views of the Church's leadership acceptable. They also saw his support of liberation theology as having "politicized everything" and reproached his proximity to Marxism. In 1985, the Congregation for the Doctrine of the Faith, directed at that time by Cardinal Joseph Ratzinger (later Pope Benedict XVI), silenced him for a year for his book Church: Charism and Power. He later accused Ratzinger of "religious terrorism".

Boff was almost silenced again in 1992 by Rome, this time to prevent him from participating in the Eco-92 Earth Summit in Rio de Janeiro, which finally led him to leave the Franciscan religious order and the priestly ministry.

Boff joined the international group of Catholic Scholars who in 2012 issued the Jubilee Declaration on reform of authority in the Catholic Church.

For most of his life Boff has worked as a professor in the academic fields of theology, ethics and philosophy throughout Brazil and also as lecturer in many universities abroad such as University of Lisbon, University of Barcelona, University of Lund, University of Oslo, University of Torino and others.

Boff commented on the election of Pope Francis in March 2013: "I am encouraged by this choice, viewing it as a pledge for a church of simplicity and of ecological ideals." He said the new pope was conservative in many respects but had liberal views on some subjects as well.

Works 
 Evangelio del Cristo cósmico. 2009. 
 El águila y la gallina. Una metáfora de la condición humana. Cuarta edición 2006. 
 Ecología: grito de la Tierra, grito de los pobres. Cuarta edición 2006. 
 Femenino y masculino. Una nueva conciencia para el encuentro de las diferencias. 2004. 
 La voz del arco iris. 2003. 
 El cuidado esencial. Ética de lo humano, compasión por la Tierra. 2002. 
 Fundamentalismo. La globalización y el futuro de la humanidad. 2003. 
 Mística y espiritualidad, junto a Frei Betto. Tercera edición 2002. 
 Ética planetaria desde el Gran Sur. 2001. 
 Gracia y experiencia humana. 2001. 
 El despertar del águila. 2000. 
 La dignidad de la Tierra. Ecología, mundialización, espiritualidad. 2000. 
 La opción-Tierra: la solución para la tierra no cae del cielo. 2008. 
 Ecclesiogenesis: The Base Communities Reinvent the Church. 1986. 
 Church: Charism and Power. 1985. 
 Los sacramentos de la vida. 1977.

References

External links 

Official home page

Right Livelihood Award
Interview to the Comunita Italiana (in Portuguese)

1938 births
People from Concórdia, Santa Catarina
Brazilian people of German descent
Brazilian Friars Minor
20th-century Brazilian Roman Catholic priests
Ludwig Maximilian University of Munich alumni
Brazilian male writers
Catholic philosophers
Living people
Brazilian socialists
Dissident Roman Catholic theologians
Laicized Roman Catholic priests
Former members of Catholic religious institutes
Brazilian Christian socialists
Brazilian anti-poverty advocates
Liberation theologians
Christian radicals
Academic staff of the Rio de Janeiro State University
Catholic socialists
Christian socialist theologians
Catholicism and far-left politics
Brazilian people of Italian descent
Brazilian people of Venetian descent